The 1958 LPGA Tour was the ninth season since the LPGA Tour officially began in 1950. The season ran from January 10 to September 14. The season consisted of 24 official money events. Mickey Wright won the most tournaments, five. Beverly Hanson led the money list with earnings of $12,639.

There was only one first-time winner in 1958, Bonnie Randolph.

The tournament results and award winners are listed below.

Tournament results
The following table shows all the official money events for the 1958 season. "Date" is the ending date of the tournament. The numbers in parentheses after the winners' names are the number of wins they had on the tour up to and including that event. Majors are shown in bold.

Awards

References

External links
LPGA Tour official site

LPGA Tour seasons
LPGA Tour